Tom Ivester (born 1969) is a former Oklahoma State Senator representing District 26, which includes Beckham, Caddo, Greer, Jackson, Kiowa, Tillman and Washita counties, from 2006 to 2014. He was an Assistant Minority Floor Leader.

Education
Ivester obtained his BA/BS from Texas Christian University and his JD from the University of Oklahoma.

Family
Tom is married to his wife DeAun and together the two have 3 children: Joseph, Jackson, and Katherine Ivester.

Residence
Tom and his family currently reside in Elk City, Oklahoma.

Professional experience
Tom Ivester is an attorney, and colonel for the United States Army Reserves, as well as Third Special Forces Group in the United States Army. In 2018 he successfully graduated the Carlisle army war college located in Carlisle Pennsylvania.His son Joseph Ivester is following in his footsteps. In 2019 he graduated from Lackland Air force base located in San Antonio Texas.

Organizations
Ivestor is a member of the American Legion and Kiwanis Club.

External links
Senator Tom Ivester - District 26 official State Senate website
Project Vote Smart - Tom Ivester (OK) profile
Follow the Money - Tom Ivester
2008 2006 campaign contributions

References

1952 births
Living people
Democratic Party Oklahoma state senators
People from Sayre, Oklahoma
21st-century American politicians